The 2002 Maidstone Borough Council election took place on 2 May 2002 to elect members of Maidstone Borough Council in Kent, England. The whole council was up for election with boundary changes since the last election in 2000. The council stayed under no overall control.

Background
All 55 seats were being contested in the election after boundary changes were implemented. The boundary changes kept the number of seats the same at 55, but reduced the wards from 28 to 26.

139 candidates stood in the election, made up of 45 Conservatives, 42 Liberal Democrats, 29 Labour, 10 Green, 8 United Kingdom Independence Party and 5 independents.

Election result
Overall turnout in the election was 31.7%.

Ward results

References

2002 English local elections
2002
2000s in Kent